Fuad Shemali (in Arabic فؤاد الشمالي) alternatively Fouad El Chemali (in Arabic فؤاد الشمالي) was born in 1936 to a Lebanese Christian-Maronite family. He studied law at the University of St. Joseph in Beirut. He adhered to the Syrian Social Nationalist Party (SSNP) in 1951, joined Fatah in the 1960s and was a leader of the Black September movement in the 1970s. He died from cancer in Geneva in August 1972.

References and notes

Ilich Ramirez Sanchez, dit "Carlos": Comment et pourquoi j’ai pris en otage les ministres de l’OPEP (in French)
Article about events involving Shemali

Arab–Israeli conflict
Syrian Social Nationalist Party in Lebanon politicians
Fatah members
1936 births
1972 deaths